"The Paltry Nude Starts on a Spring Voyage" is a poem from Wallace Stevens's first book, Harmonium. Originally published in 1919, it is in the public domain. Despite general agreement that it is indebted to Botticelli's The Birth of Venus, there is uncertainty about the nature of the debt. 

Helen Vendler takes it as obvious that the poem is about "our impoverished American Venus, who has none of the trappings of Botticelli's Venus, but who will eventually accumulate aura and mythological fullness through new American art". She dismisses the English poet Craig Raine's identification of the paltry nude with a sailboat. ("The nude is, one guesses, a sailing boat....Later, the ship will be weather-beaten, a goldener nude, and will eventually sink.") That only confirms that "the English incomprehension of Stevens continues almost unabated", she acidly remarks, conceding that Frank Kermode is the exception that proves the rule. She might concede that the "archaic" one of the first two lines is foam-arisen Aphrodite, who the paltry nude is not, but might well disapprove of the suggestion that the one who "scuds the glitters" is the American Venus (reduced to scudding on a weed) and that "the goldener nude" is Botticelli's Venus.

Ronald Sukenick declares with equal certainty that "the nude is an emblematic figure of spring. There is a comparison between spring, in the first part of the poem, and a similar figure representing summer, in the latter part. Thus spring is 'paltry,' particularly early spring, spring at the start of her voyage, as compared with the fullness of summer described later on." 'Scrurry', though often reproduced, is a misprint for "scurry", as his posthumous papers show.

Compare Stevens's poem "Bantam in Pine-Woods" which also makes a statement about the new American art.

Notes

References 
 Buttel, R. Wallace Stevens: The Making of Harmonium. 1967: Princeton University Press.
 Raine, Craig. Encounter 53 (November 1079).
 Sukenick, Ronald. Wallace Stevens: Musing the Obscure. 1967: New York University Press. 
 Vendler, Helen. Words Chosen Out Of Desire. 1984: University of Tennessee Press.

1919 poems
American poems
Poetry by Wallace Stevens